No Singles is a compilation album by Canadian rock duo Japandroids.

Release
No Singles is a compilation album consisting of Japandroids' first two EPs: Lullaby Death Jams (2008) and All Lies (2007). Released by Polyvinyl on 11 May 2010, the compilation represents all of the material Japandroids recorded prior to the release of their debut album, Post-Nothing (2009).

Both EPs were originally self-released by the band, and had previously been out of print. Both were remastered by John Golden for this release. A booklet included with No Singles details Japandroids' early history, with rare photos, show fliers, etc. The band has stated that the re-release of their earliest material in 2010 was strictly designed to appease their fans desire for more music, as they would not be able to record a second album until 2011 due to an extensive touring schedule.

The title of "Darkness on the Edge of Gastown" is a dual reference to Bruce Springsteen's 1978 album Darkness on the Edge of Town and the Gastown neighbourhood of Vancouver.

Track listing

Personnel
Japandroids
 Brian King – guitar, lead vocals
 David Prowse – drums, backup vocals

Technical personnel
 Matt Skillings – Engineer
 Thomas Shields – Engineer

Original EPs

References 

Japandroids albums
2010 compilation albums
Polyvinyl Record Co. albums